Missile Attack is a clone of Atari, Inc.'s Missile Command arcade game. It was developed by Cornsoft Group and published in 1980 by Adventure International for the TRS-80 and Apple II.

Gameplay
Missile Attack is a game in which the player commands two Anti-ballistic missile silos that are used to destroy missiles coming down in waves from the top of the screen.

Reception
Glenn Mai reviewed Missile Attack in The Space Gamer No. 54. Mai commented that "Despite its problems, Missile Attack is a very good game.  Recommended for any arcade buff."

Reviews
Moves #55, p31

References

External links
80-U.S. review
C+VG review

Adventure International games
Apple II games
TRS-80 games
Video game clones